Tambja tenuilineata is a species of colourful sea slug, a dorid nudibranch, a marine gastropod mollusk in the family Polyceridae.

References

External links

Polyceridae
Gastropods described in 2005